Jambul "Jaba" Jighauri (born 8 July 1992) is a Georgian footballer who plays as a midfielder for Dinamo Batumi.

Club career
Jigauri started his career with Dinamo Tbilisi, making his professional debut for the team on 22 May 2011 against Torpedo Kutaisi, and scoring a 55th-minute equaliser in a 1–2 loss at the Boris Paichadze Dinamo Arena.

On 14 January 2017, Jighauri signed for FK Vardar.

On 27 February 2018, Jighauri joined FC Aktobe in the Kazakhstan Premier League. The following week Jighauri moved to FC Ordabasy on loan until the summer transfer window, with Aleksandar Simčević going the opposite way.

On 18 July 2018, Jighauri signed a two-year contract with French Ligue 2 club Grenoble Foot 38.

On 20 July 2019, Jighauri signed a 1.5 year contract with Georgian Erovnuli Liga club Dinamo Batumi.

International career
Jigauri played his first international match at the under-21 level on 3 June 2011 in 0–1 win against Croatia. In May 2016, he was called up to Georgia's senior team for the first time. He earned his first cap on the 27 May in a 3–1 loss to Slovakia, replacing Valeri Qazaishvili for the final 12 minutes in Wels, Austria.

Honours
Dinamo Tbilisi
 Umaglesi Liga: 2012–13, 2015–16
 Georgian Cup: 2012–13, 2014–15, 2015–16
 Georgian Super Cup: 2015

Chikhura
 Georgian Super Cup: 2013

References

External links
 
 
 

1992 births
Living people
Footballers from Tbilisi
Association football midfielders
FC Dinamo Tbilisi players
FC Chikhura Sachkhere players
FK Vardar players
FC Aktobe players
FC Ordabasy players
Grenoble Foot 38 players
Georgia (country) international footballers
Footballers from Georgia (country)